The National Baptist Convention, USA, Inc., more commonly known as the National Baptist Convention (NBC USA or NBC), is a primarily African American Baptist Christian denomination in the United States. It is headquartered at the Baptist World Center in Nashville, Tennessee and affiliated with the Baptist World Alliance. It is also the largest predominantly Black Christian denomination in the United States and the second largest Baptist denomination in the world.

History

Origins

The root of cooperative efforts among Black Baptists began in the Antebellum period. Both free blacks and slaves were welcomed into the Baptist movement by missionaries in the First Great Awakening and Second Great Awakening. Independent Black Baptist churches were formed in Petersburg, Virginia and Savannah, Georgia before the American Civil War. Under the slave societies of the South, they had to belong to white Baptist associations. Black congregations were required by law to have white ministers and supervision by law, especially after the slave rebellion of Nat Turner in 1831.

The first attempts at wider black cooperative efforts began in the North, with Ohio and Illinois leading the way. In 1834, Black Baptists in Ohio formed the Providence Baptist Association. In 1838, following the lead of the Baptists in Ohio, Black Baptists in Illinois formed the Wood River Baptist Association.

As early as 1840, Black Baptists sought to develop a cooperative movement beyond state lines. Baptists in New York and the Middle Atlantic states formed the American Baptist Missionary Convention. The spirit of cooperation beyond state lines soon spread westward. In 1864, during the American Civil War, the Black Baptists of the West and South organized the Northwestern Baptist Convention and the Southern Baptist Convention.

In 1866, following the war, these two conventions met with the American Baptist Convention and formed the Consolidated American Baptist Convention. One of the great successes of the new Consolidated American Baptist Convention was the support given to Black Baptists in the South to form state conventions. Black Baptists in the former Confederacy overwhelmingly left white-dominated churches to form independent congregations and get away from white supervision.

After emancipation, Black Baptists in the South, with the support of the Consolidated Convention, formed their own state conventions. Among these were Alabama, North Carolina, Virginia, Arkansas, and Kentucky. Despite the pioneer work of the Consolidated Convention, regionalism continued among Black Baptists. In 1873, the Black Baptists of the West formed the General Association of the Western States and Territories, and in 1874 the East organized the New England Baptist Missionary Convention. This continued regionalism and other factors caused the decline and eventual demise of the Consolidated American Baptist Convention.

According to historian Wilson Fallin Jr., black preachers interpreted the American Civil War as:

Convention founding
In 1880, about 150 Baptist pastors met in Montgomery, Alabama, and formed the Baptist Foreign Mission Convention. The formation of the Baptist Foreign Mission Convention was to some degree a result of the demise of the Consolidated American Baptist Convention. The Consolidated Convention's death created a vacuum in mission work, especially for African missions. In response to this void, William W. Colley of Virginia, who had served as missionary to Nigeria under the Southern Baptist Convention during the 1870s, issued a call for Black Baptists to meet in Montgomery, Alabama, in order to organize a national convention to do extensive foreign missionary work.

At the initial 1880 meeting, William H. McAlpine of Alabama was elected President of the Foreign Mission Convention; he is considered the first President of the National Baptist Convention.

Two other national Black conventions formed. In 1886, William J. Simmons of Kentucky led the formation of the American National Baptist Convention. In 1893 W. Bishop Johnson of Washington, D.C. led the formation of the National Baptist Education Convention. The desire to have one convention remained alive and the movement reached its fruition on September 24, 1895 at the Friendship Baptist Church in Atlanta, when these three conventions came together to form the National Baptist Convention of the United States of America. The heart of the new convention was that the three former conventions serve as the three boards of the convention: foreign missions, home missions, and education.

Convention splits
In 1897, during the Elias Camp Morris administration, a group of National Baptist pastors left the convention and formed the Lott Carey Foreign Mission Convention. The separation was centered on two issues: the location of the foreign mission board and greater cooperation with White Baptists.

The second split, also during Morris's presidency, came in 1915 over ownership and operation of the National Baptist Publishing Board. The National Baptist Publishing Board was the most successful agency and was led by R. H. Boyd. Leaders and pastors of the convention became suspicious of the actions of the board when they did not receive the reports they thought due them. A debate ensued concerning the ownership.

Those who supported Boyd and his view that the board was independent of the convention formed the National Baptist Convention of America. It became known as the Unincorporated Convention (now the National Baptist Convention of America International, Inc.). Because of the question of incorporation, leaders who remained in the original convention led a movement to incorporate their organization. The constitution was amended in 1916 and the convention was later incorporated, taking the name of National Baptist Convention, USA, Inc.

During the Joseph Jackson tenure, a third split occurred in the convention. The two key issues were tenure and the lack of support of the civil rights movement. The Civil Rights movement of the 1950s and 1960s, known for increased public activism, demonstrations and protests was highly controversial in many Baptist churches. Often the ministers preached spiritual salvation rather than political activism.

Jackson, the convention's leader, had supported the Montgomery bus boycott of 1956, but by 1960 he told the members they should not become involved in civil rights activism. Based in Chicago, Jackson was a close ally of Mayor Richard J. Daley and the Chicago Democrats. He opposed public activism of Martin Luther King Jr. and his aide, the young Jesse Jackson Sr., (no relation to Joseph Jackson). Gardner C. Taylor of New York challenged Jackson for the presidency, but lost.

After Jackson was re-elected (and following a violent dispute at the convention involving one death), a group led by L. Venchael Booth formed a new convention at the Zion Baptist Church in Cincinnati, Ohio in 1961. They named themselves the Progressive National Baptist Convention. These activists supported the extensive activism of King's Southern Christian Leadership Conference. The Progressive National Baptists also established ecumenical relations with the American Baptist Churches USA.

In 1992, Paul S. Morton of New Orleans, Louisiana formed a fellowship within the convention. It was named the Full Gospel Baptist Church Fellowship. This charismatic Baptist fellowship in the convention explored spiritual gifts, speaking in tongues, prophecy, exclamatory worship, etc. The leadership of this fellowship later separated completely from the National Baptist Convention, USA, Inc., and is one of the largest Full Gospel movement denominations in the United States.

Racial reconciliation 
From 2015 to 2016, President Jerry Young collaborated with the Southern Baptist Convention on racial reconciliation. Meeting with President Ronnie Floyd of the SBC, 10 pastors from each convention were assembled to discuss race relations; in 2016, Young revealed several difficulties surrounding racial reconciliation to The New York Times, stating:

Floyd, describing 2015 as a "historic year of progress in racial healing," with the SBC and NBC collaborations, succeeds the election of Fred Luter Jr. as the Southern Baptist Convention's first African American president, alongside the adoption of an informal name, "Great Commission Baptists" which gained significant adoption by 2020.

Statistics
According to a denomination census released in 2022, it claimed 21,145 churches and 8,415,100 members, an increase since 2010's 10,358 churches and 5,197,512 members. Overall, the National Baptist Convention continues to remain the largest historically and predominantly African American or Black Christian denomination in the United States, while separated bodies such as the theologically conservative to moderate National Baptist Convention of America have declined in membership (2000's 3,500,000 and more than 8,000 churches to 2020's 3,106,000 members in 12,336 churches) and the theologically moderate to liberal Progressive National Baptist Convention (2009's 1,010,000 members in 1,500 churches to 2020's 1,500,000 members in 1,362 churches) has increased.

In 2014, the Pew Research Center estimated 23% of its membership were 65 and older, 36% aged 50–64, 30% aged 30–49, and 11% aged 18–29; in 2007, 14% of the National Baptist Convention's membership were aged 18–29, 35% aged 30–49, 29% aged 50–64, and 21% aged 65 and older. The largest generational group as of 2014 were Baby Boomers (43%), followed by Generation X (28%). The Silent Generation was the third largest (14%) and Millennials were fourth (13%). From 2007 to 2014, membership of Millennials and Generation X increased, replacing the Silent Generation (at 20% in 2007). An estimated 61% of the National Baptist Convention was made up of women, and 39% men at the 2014 study. Ethnically, the convention remained predominantly African American (99%), with Hispanics and Latin Americans being the second largest group (1%). Less than 1% were White, and less than 1% each were Asian or of another race or ethnicity.

Theologically, 90% of the convention's membership believed in God with absolute certainty, and 8% believed fairly certainly. About 91% of the convention believed religion was very important and 8% considered it somewhat important. At least 60% of National Baptists attended church weekly and 82% prayed at least daily; 54% of National Baptists attended bible study and Sunday schools weekly, and 23% seldom or never have. The majority of its members read Scripture either weekly or once a week, and 64% believed all of the Bible should be taken literally. Of its Bible-reading population, 21% believed not all of the Bible should be taken literally, and 7% believed it was not the Word of God.

Governance
The National Baptist Convention is a convention governed similar to a presbytery yet allows its member churches to govern themselves under the congregationalist polity.

Presidency 

E. C. Morris was elected president of the National Baptist Convention USA in 1895 and served for 27 years. His tenure was important for laying the foundation of the convention. In addition to managing growth and organization of new chapters, his presidency founded the National Baptist Publishing House in Nashville, Tennessee; blacks wanted to publish literature written by their own ministers.

In 1890, the American Baptist Publication Society had refused to publish writings of Black ministers because of resistance from their White Southern clients. This event, more than any other, inspired Blacks to develop their own convention and publishing arm. One year after the formation of the convention, the National Baptist Publication Board was established under the leadership of Richard Boyd in Nashville, Tennessee. It was given the right to supply National Baptist churches with general ministry and Sunday school supplies. In a short time the publishing house became the largest Black publishing enterprise in the world.

In 1902, the Woman's State Convention of Tennessee elected African American Virginia E. Walker Broughton, to serve as the first woman National Corresponding Secretary for the National Baptist Convention. The twenty-seven years of Morris' leadership represented the formative period for the convention.

Upon the death of E. C. Morris, L. K. Williams became president of the convention in 1924. During his 16 years' tenure, he expanded the publishing board to gain increased support. Williams appointed L. G. Jordan as General Secretary of the Board and laid plans for a new building. The building was opened for inspection in 1925. On the recommendation of Williams, it was named the Morris Building in honor of the legacy of E. C. Morris. The Layman's Department was also established.

David V. Jemison succeeded Williams as president of the convention in 1940. His two major accomplishments during his 13 years were paying off the mortgage on the Morris Memorial Building and the purchase of the Bath House for African American use in the resort of Hot Springs, Arkansas.

In 1953, Joseph H. Jackson of Chicago became the NBC USA President, serving until 1982. His 29-year tenure was the longest of any president, and spanned some of the most active years of the Civil Rights Movement. During these years, African Americans gained passage of federal laws protecting and enforcing their rights to public access and voting, especially in the South. Among President Jackson's many contributions were new commissions and restructuring of the convention. He also purchased the National Baptist Freedom Farm and set up an unrestricted scholarship at Roosevelt University. He was noted for low tolerance of dissent. He said that social protests were not enough, but people needed to prove their economic productivity as well.

In 1983, T. J. Jemison became president of the convention, serving for 12 years. He completed construction of the Baptist World Center, a headquarters for the convention in Nashville, Tennessee. He spoke out on public issues more than some presidents, and expressed his opposition to the Gulf War. In a controversial statement, he spoke in favor of the noted African American boxer Mike Tyson, who had been convicted of rape. The uproar caused by Jemison's remarks translated into a deep decline of membership and associated churches in the convention in 1992. Later presidents built up the national convention again.

Henry Lyons of Florida was elected president in 1994. The Lyons tenure was characterized by much activity as he established a unified program, reduced the debt on the Baptist World Center, and dissolved the debt on the Sunday School Publishing Board. In addition, many commissions were added to the convention. Legal problems, however, forced Lyons to resign from the presidency. Lyons unsuccessfully ran again for President in 2009 with National Congress President, R.B. Holmes of Tallahassee, Florida, as his Vice-President.

Stewart Cleveland Cureton, Vice President-At-Large, took over the leadership of the convention in 1999 and served the remainder of Lyons' tenure. In 1999, William J. Shaw of Philadelphia was elected as president, serving until 2009. His presidency was centered on the motto and theme 'V.I.S.A': "Vision, Integrity, Structure and Accountability." He worked hard to reestablish integrity and credibility in the convention.

Julius R. Scruggs of Huntsville, Alabama was elected president in 2009 and served one 5-year term. He did not seek re-election. In September 2014, Jerry Young of Mississippi was elected president, with some of its members expecting progressive teaching and administration. During Young's presidency—in 2022—U.S. Vice President Kamala Harris spoke during the 142nd Annual Session of the National Baptist Convention in Houston, Texas stating, "faith requires action" as she called on African American faith leaders to continue fighting for inalienable rights toward all, remarking the following as Baptists have historically advocated for the separation of church and state:"A constitutional right that hadn't been recognized was taken away from the women of America, and people of America, and on this issue I feel very strongly...one does not have to abandon their faith or their religious beliefs to agree that a woman should be able to make that decision about her own body, and her government should not be making that decision for her...this is this is not about partisanship. It's not about who you voted for in the last election, or who you plan to vote for in the next election. In terms of political ideology, it's just a very practical principle, which is women should have the power to make decisions about their own bodies. It's that basic."She also publicly commended her Baptist pastor who has been a member of the convention while also dually affiliating with the American Baptist Churches USA (previously known as the Northern Baptist Convention). Her presence stirred controversy among several white evangelical Protestants and Southern Baptists, deriding Black Baptists.

State conventions 
The National Baptist Convention's members form voluntary state and territory-wide local conventions. The state conventions are autonomous organizations and separately incorporated; some conventions are dually aligned with other Baptist conventions.

Congress of Christian Education

The National Baptist Congress of Christian Education is the training arm of the convention. It is an annual event, held in June that draws more than 50,000 attendees from around the United States and the world. The congress includes over 300 classes, lectures and group discussion panels targeted and relevant to every age group and every area of the convention.

Sunday School Publishing Board

The Sunday School Publishing Board is the official publisher of the convention and provides all of the educational resources of the convention. The board was founded in 1915 and is one of the largest African American owned publishing companies. The Sunday School Publishing Board supplies books, text books, curriculum and other resources to over 36,000 churches.

Laymen's Movement

The National Baptist Laymen's Movement of the National Baptist Convention U.S.A., Inc. was organized at the Forty-third Session of the National Baptist Convention in Los Angeles, California, in 1923. The new President of the convention, L. K. Williams presided. The movement came into existence under the leadership of Deacon John L. Webb, a Christian businessman from Hot Springs, Arkansas. John Webb served as the first president of the organization and continued in that position until his death in 1946.

Webb in his open letter to national laymen, appearing in the August 30, 1924 issue of the National Baptist Voice stated the long range objectives of the Movement: "And wherever the Laymen's Movement is organized, the spirit of it will be to see that the pastor is well paid; and to foster and encourage by words and our money the institutions of learning that have made space for theological departments, so as to have a better educated ministry, better Sunday school superintendents, teachers, and B.Y.P.U. workers throughout our denomination."

The first annual session of the Laymen's Movement was held September 10–15, 1924 in Nashville, Tennessee. The second annual session was held September 10–11, 1925 at the Econ Baptist church in Baltimore, Maryland. At the end of the second session twenty-five laymen, five ministers and five persons representing other church organizations had been official registrants.

His Vice President-at-Large Brother J. C. McClendon of Jackson, Mississippi, succeeded John L. Webb. After serving six years he was succeeded by his Vice President-at-Large, Brother Allen Jordan of Brooklyn, New York. In the annual session of 1971 in Cleveland, Ohio, Jordan turned the reins over to his Vice President-at-Large, Deacon Walter Cade Jr. of Kansas City, Kansas.

During the tenure of Walter Cade Jr., many laymen ministries and programs were birthed. The regional workshop concept was started in 1971. The Allen Jordan Seminars for laymen was started in 1981 during the annual Congress of Christian Education. The Junior Laymen Basketball Tournament and Bible Bowl were started in 1981. The Junior Laymen's Convention was moved from the September session to the June session in 1981. The national laymen became involved in the Men's Department of the World Baptist Alliance. The laymen made their first work-witness trip to Africa to repair the convention's mission stations in 1976.

Following Walter Cade Jr. was Jerry Gash of Los Angeles, California. Under Jerry Gash's leadership he initiated the process of membership to identify the active laymen in the movement. He started the Male Chorus Sing-off and two mission projects for Africa, 25,000 pairs of shoes and 75,000 school supplies. Jerry Gash started the Southern Region Workshop in 1997. Glen Chelf of New Mexico served on an interim basis in 2000. Harold Simmons of Kansas City, Kansas was appointed president of the Laymen's Movement by William Shaw in 2000 to succeed Glen Chelf.

Women's Auxiliary

The first president, Sarah Willie Layton, was the daughter of William H. and Mary H. Phillips. She was a graduate of LeMoyne College in Tennessee, honorary member of Zeta Phi Beta sorority, and active member of the Woman's National Republican Committee. Layton helped to establish the National Baptist Missionary Training School at Nashville, Tennessee and helped to maintain missionaries on both the home and foreign fields. Her service expanded almost 50 years (1900-1948).

The second president, Nannie Helen Burroughs, first served as Corresponding Secretary to the Woman's Convention over 40 years. She was the only child of parents who were born into slavery. She was a member of numerous civic organizations, a prolific orator and author of several books and publications.

Mary Olivia Brooks Ross was the third President of the Woman's Auxiliary, serving from 1961 through 1995. She was born to the parentage of Professor Brookins and Mrs. B (Beatrice Brookins), both educators. She married Solomon David Ross, who was the pastor of the Shiloh Baptist Church of Detroit for 39 years. Ross taught school after earning her B.A. from Spelman College in Atlanta, Georgia and doing graduate studies at Michigan and Wayne State Universities.

Cynthia Perry Ray, the fourth president who served the convention from 1995 until 2000; she was the former first vice-president to Ross. She was born to Walter and Beatrice Perry of Penllyn, Pennsylvania. She held several leadership positions in the Woman's Auxiliary of the National Baptist Convention and also was elected Vice President of the Baptist World Alliance in Buenos Aires, Argentina in 1995, serving in that post until the year 2000.

Rosa Burrell Cooper served as president from 2001 to 2004. She began her service with the statement, "Together we can do it through Mission, Evangelism and Education." She stated: "I believe that as President of the Woman's Auxiliary, it is my mission to provide intelligent, articulate and responsive leadership in promoting spiritual growth of Christian women across the United States of America. To that end, I am committed to fostering and promoting group spiritual growth and personal development through programs which interpret, teach and apply the living and life-giving Word of our God."

President Hugh Dell Gatewood began her official service in January 2005 and served for 12 years. In January 2017, Cynthia Perkins Smith was appointed as the President of the Women's Auxiliary.

Dual alignment

Known to occur though infrequently, a state convention, district association or member church of the National Baptist Convention may dually align with another organization. The autonomous make-up of the NBC USA gives local congregations the latitude to govern themselves and contribute to the causes of other religious bodies as it deems necessary. Some members dually align with the Lott Carey Foreign Mission Convention which offers the NBC USA member a convention-wide focus on foreign missions; others may align with the National Baptist Convention of America or Full Gospel Baptist Church Fellowship; there are also dually aligned affiliates with the American Baptist Churches USA such as Abyssinian Baptist Church.

The autonomous nature of the member churches, associations, and state conventions allows the jurisdictions to decide their focus, interpret scripture, and define theology on issues not specified in the foundational truths of the Baptist Articles of Faith as well as dually align with a convention with a mission specialized on a specific issue.

Joint Convention

The Joint Convention of National Baptists converge in an American city every four years and comprises the four Black Baptist conventions. The other three member conventions all originated from or trace origin to NBC USA and together the four groups represent over 17,000,000 African American Baptists in the United States. This convention of National Baptists meet to harness the power and influence of their collective bodies for Christian missions and social action. To date, this Joint Convention has only met twice—once in Nashville, Tennessee and in Atlanta, Georgia.

Doctrine 
The National Baptist Convention has a Baptist confession of faith, which is a derivative of the New Hampshire Confession of Faith. Members of the convention also adopt Keach's Catechism, the 1689 Baptist Confession of Faith, and a church covenant. As such, the National Baptist Convention in its Baptist ethos maintains Trinitarianism, justification by grace, evangelism, believers' baptism, and the separation of church and state among its uncompromising essentials to every member of the denomination.

Women pastors, ministers and deacons
The convention does not make official positions binding on its member congregations, state conventions, and institutions. There are many women ordained and/or licensed and serving in the convention affiliated congregations. A number of women serve as pastors of congregations, and as trustees to the boards of American Baptist College. Some congregations do not ordain or license women as ministers. Some congregations have women deacons, others as deaconess, some have both. Two Baptist National Baptist Women Pastors have been elected as Presidents of State Conventions. Patricia A. Gould-Champ, senior pastor of Faith Community Baptist Church in Richmond, Virginia and Associate Professor of Practical Theology at Samuel DeWitt Proctor School of Theology at Virginia Union University was elected as the 35th and first female president of the Baptist General Convention of Virginia in 2003. Marylin Monroe Harris, senior pastor of the First Baptist Church of Teaneck in Teaneck, NJ, became President of the United Missionary Baptist Convention State of New Jersey, the 2nd Vice Moderator of the North Jersey District Missionary Baptist Association, the Past President of the Black Clergy Council of Englewood, Teaneck and Vicinity and the Past Moderator of the Essex Association of the American Baptist Churches of New Jersey and the first female African American Chaplain of the Teaneck Fire Department. Many women serve as moderators for district associations affiliated with the National Baptist Convention.

Same-sex marriage 
"The National Baptist Convention USA Inc. does not have an 'official' position on any issues with regards to homosexuality." The National Baptist Convention released an official position statement in 2012 that defines marriage as the exclusive union of a man and a woman. A subsequent position statement in 2014 prohibited the convention's military chaplains from officiating same-sex marriages or civil unions stating that they "are not to participate in any activity that implies or condones same sex marriage or same sex union." In 2006 the organization stated that a majority of their member churches would hold that homosexuality is not a legitimate expression of God's will and would be opposed to ordaining active homosexuals or lesbians for any type of ministry in their church. Nevertheless, given the denomination's diversity, some pastors and congregations affiliated with the National Baptist Convention announced their support for same-sex marriage. "The National Baptist Convention, USA, Incorporated does not dictate to its constituent churches what position to take on issues because we believe in the autonomy of the local church."

Abortion 
Likewise, the National Baptist Convention allows its congregations to decide whether they support or oppose abortion.

Convention affiliates

The National Baptist Convention is one of the predominantly and historically African American Christian denominations in the United States with at least four colleges and universities affiliated with it solely. Among them, American Baptist College—located in Nashville, Tennessee—has been the primarily promoted higher education system. Additionally, Morehouse College has been affiliated with the convention alongside Shaw University and Selma University. The American Baptist Churches USA-affiliated institutions of Virginia Union University, Florida Memorial University, and Virginia University of Lynchburg have also affiliated with the convention.

See also

 Baptists in the United States
 Black church
 Cecelia Adkins, executive director of Sunday School Publishing Board
 Christianity in the United States
 Bible
 Born again
 Baptist beliefs
 Worship service (evangelicalism)
 Jesus Christ
 Believers' Church
 Religion in Black America

Notes and references

Notes

References

Position and Policy Statements (primary sources)

Further reading

External links
 Study on the history and contemporary challenges of the NBCUSA, Inc. https://web.archive.org/web/20070808071006/http://www.sociology.northwestern.edu/faculty/morris/docmorrislee-baptist.pdf
 The National Baptist Convention
 Sunday School Publishing Board
 Foreign Mission Board

National Baptist Convention, USA
Baptist denominations in the United States
Baptist organizations established in the 19th century
Baptist Christianity in Tennessee
Members of the World Council of Churches
Historically African-American Christian denominations
Religious organizations established in 1895
Members of the National Council of Churches
African-American organizations
1895 establishments in the United States